Retaliation, Revenge and Get Back is the debut studio album by American rapper Daz Dillinger, released on March 31, 1998 through Death Row Records and Priority Records. The promotional singles released from the album were "In California" and "It Might Sound Crazy", which both also had music videos, including an animated one.

Background
By 1998, Daz Dillinger was one of the last remaining artists on Death Row after its decline in 1996 after the death of 2Pac, and the departure of Dr. Dre. Daz was the head of Death Row while Suge Knight was imprisoned for violating his parole, caused by a fight he, 2Pac, and fellow Death Row members got into with Orlando Anderson in Las Vegas on Sept 7th. The album peaked at number 8 on the Billboard 200 on April 18 with 89,000 copies sold in its first week. Daz soon left after this album to form his own record company, D.P.G. Recordz and worked with such artists as Soopafly, Mac Shawn, Crooked I, South Sentrell, and others.

The album was also the last original Death Row album for seven years, and the last to feature any kind of G-Funk production. Since Daz was one of the last of a dying breed, he largely moved on to different techniques after this album, this could be considered the last hallmark of the musical trend.

The album's cover artwork references the cover of Marvin Gaye's album, In Our Lifetime.

Track listing

Notes
"Pimp City" can also be found on Soopafly's Dat Whoopty Woop

Sample credits
"It's Going Down" contains a sample from "Mos***up" performed by Just-Ice
"Our Daily Bread" contains a sample from "Do What I Feel performed by Tha Dogg Pound featuring The Lady of Rage)
"In California" contains a sample from "Beware of My Crew" performed by LBC Crew

Charts

Weekly charts

Year-end charts

References

External links
 Retaliation, Revenge and Get Back at Discogs

Daz Dillinger albums
Albums produced by Daz Dillinger
Albums produced by Soopafly
1998 debut albums
Death Row Records albums
Priority Records albums
G-funk albums